USS Massachusetts was a steamer built in 1845 and acquired by the U.S. War Department in 1847. She was used by the U.S. Army as a transport during the Mexican–American War before being transferred to U.S. Navy Department in 1849. She traveled widely, including transiting Cape Horn several times as part of her official duties on both sides of the Americas. During her years of service she spent most of her time on the west coast of North America.

Construction/commercial use and first Army service
Massachusetts, was a wooden steamer, was built in the shipyard of Samuel Hall, Boston, Massachusetts, under the supervision of Edward H. Delano for Mr. R. B. Forbes in 1845. As an auxiliary steam packet, she helped pioneer commercial steamer service between New York City and Liverpool, England. She was purchased by the War Department in 1847 and served during the Mexican–American War as a troop transport for the Army. In 1848, she steamed round Cape Horn to San Francisco, California, possibly transporting some members and intended for the use of a Joint Commission of Navy and Army Officers (Joint Commission-also called the "Joint Board of Army and Navy Officers" and "Joint Board of Engineers and Naval Officers") who were assigned to explore the U.S. West Coast to identify potential sites for forts, lighthouses and buoys. The Joint Commission consisted of three army engineers: Maj. John L. Smith, Maj. Cornelius A. Ogden and 1st Lt. Danville Leadbetter; and three naval officers:  Comdr. Louis M. Goldsborough, Comdr. G.J. Van Brunt, and Lt. Simon F. Blunt.

Pacific Squadron
Massachusetts was transferred to the U.S. Navy Department at San Francisco Bay, 1 August 1849; and commissioned the same day, Lt. Sam. R. Knox in command. She was assigned to the Pacific Squadron and was detailed for use by the Joint Commission.  Due to the inability to hire crew members, Massachusetts along with the U.S. Survey schooner Ewing, under the command of William Pope McArthur sailed to Hawaii for the winter of 1849–50 to acquire crew members from King Kamehameha III. When they returned in March 1850, the Joint Commission made its preliminary recommendations to president Millard Fillmore as to reservations of islands and lands around San Francisco Bay, then they and the Massachusetts sailed up to Puget Sound. After a cursory examination of the mouth of the Columbia River, the ship and the Joint Commission returned to California in July 1850. After a trip to San Diego, the Joint Commission made its final recommendation on 30 November 1850, by which time the Massachusetts either had begun regular Navy duties, or was transporting other personnel surveying the west coast.

She departed San Francisco for the east coast 12 August 1852; steamed via ports in Ecuador, Chile, and Brazil; and arrived Norfolk, Virginia, 17 March 1853. She decommissioned the following day.

South America
Massachusetts recommissioned at Norfolk 2 May 1854, Lt. Richard W. Meade in command. After fitting out, she departed for the Pacific Ocean 5 July, reached the Straits of Magellan 13 December, and arrived at the Mare Island Navy Yard, 8 May 1855. During June and July she cruised the coast between San Francisco and the Columbia River; thence, she sailed for Central America 25 August. She showed the flag from Mexico to Nicaragua and returned to San Francisco 9 January 1856.

Puget Sound

Battle of Port Gamble

Massachusetts departed Mare Island on 17 February 1856 with guns and ammunition for Seattle, Washington, where she arrived 24 February. She operated in Puget Sound and the Strait of Juan de Fuca for more than a year, visiting ports in Washington Territory and the British Crown Colony of Vancouver Island. The Massachusetts was sent from there to Port Gamble, Washington Territory on Puget Sound, where raiding parties from the indigenous Tlingit nation located in British and Russian territories had been attacking the local Coast Salish Native Americans. When the warriors refused to hand over those among them who had attacked the Puget Sound Native American communities, USS Massachusetts landed a shore party and a battle ensued in which 26 natives and one sailor were killed. In the aftermath of this, Colonel Isaac Ebey, the first settler on Whidbey Island, was shot and beheaded on 11 August 1857 by a raiding party in revenge for the killing of a native chief during similar raids the year before.  British authorities demurred on pursuing or attacking the northern tribes as they passed northward through British waters off Victoria and Ebey's killers were never caught.

She departed the Pacific Northwest on 4 April 1857, reached Mare Island on 9 April, and decommissioned there on 17 June.

Army service
On 5 January 1859 Secretary of the Navy Isaac Toucey ordered the Commandant of the Mare Island Navy Yard to fit out Massachusetts prior to transfer back to the War Department. She was turned over to the Army Quartermaster Corps in May 1859 and during the next few years cruised Puget Sound "for the protection of the inhabitants of that quarter", which was going through rapid change and an influx of miners and settlers as a consequence of the Fraser Gold Rush and successive rushes just to the north in the Colony of British Columbia, and also as part of US military force assembled in the area during the period of confrontation with the Royal Navy and Royal Marines known as the Pig War, a bloodless though tense dispute over the boundary through the San Juan Islands. The Quartermaster General of the Army ordered Massachusetts re-transferred to the Navy 27 January 1862. Subsequently, she was placed in ordinary at Mare Island and surveyed.

Renamed Farallones
Massachusetts underwent conversion to a storeship. Her engines were removed, and she was converted into a bark. Renamed Farallones in January 1863, she commissioned on 17 June 1863, Acting Master C. C. Wells in command. She served ships of the Pacific Squadron as a storeship until February 1867 when she decommissioned at Mare Island. She was sold at San Francisco to Moore & Co. on 15 May 1867.

References

 

Ships built in Boston
Mexican–American War ships of the United States
Ships of the Union Navy
Steamships of the United States Navy
Barques of the United States Navy
Gunboats of the United States Navy
Native American history of Washington (state)
Washington Territory
Military history of Washington (state)
Stores ships of the United States Navy
1845 ships